United Nations Command (UNC or UN Command) is the multinational military force established to support the Republic of Korea (South Korea) during and after the Korean War. It was the first international unified command in history, and the first attempt at collective security pursuant to the Charter of the United Nations.

The UNC was established on 7 July 1950 following the UN Security Council's recognition of North Korean aggression against South Korea. The motion passed because the Soviet Union, a close ally of North Korea and a member of the UN Security Council, was boycotting the UN at the time over its recognition of the Republic of China rather than the People's Republic of China. UN member states were called to provide assistance in repelling the North's invasion, with the UNC providing a cohesive command structure under which the disparate forces would operate. During the course of the war, 22 nations contributed military or medical personnel to UN Command; although the United States led the UNC and provided the bulk of its troops and funding, all participants formally fought under the auspices of the UN, with the operation classified as a "UN-led police action".

On 27 July 1953, United Nations Command, the Korean People's Army, and the Chinese People's Volunteers signed the Korean Armistice Agreement, ending open hostilities. The agreement established the Military Armistice Commission (MAC), consisting of representatives of the signatories, to supervise the implementation of the armistice terms, and the Neutral Nations Supervisory Commission (NNSC), composed of nations that did not participate in the conflict, to monitor the armistice's restrictions on the parties' reinforcing or rearming themselves. In 1975, the UN General Assembly adopted resolution 3390 (XXX), which called upon the parties to the Armistice Agreement to replace it with a peace agreement, and expressed the hope that UNC would be dissolved on 1 January 1976. But the UNC continues to function after that.

Since 1953, UNC's primary duties have been to maintain the armistice and facilitate diplomacy between North and South Korea. Although "MAC" meetings have not occurred since 1994, UN Command representatives routinely engage members of the Korean People's Army in formal and informal meetings. The most recent formal negotiations on the terms of Armistice occurred between October and November 2018. Duty officers from both sides of the Joint Security Area (commonly known as the Truce Village of Panmunjom) conduct daily communications checks and have the ability to engage face-to-face when the situation demands.

Origin and legal status 
United Nations Command operates under the mandates of UN Security Council (UNSC) Resolution 82, 83, 84 and 85. These passed while the Soviet Union was boycotting the UN for awarding China's seat in the Security Council to the Republic of China. While the UN had some military authority through Chapter VII of the United Nations Charter, early Cold War tensions meant that the forces envisaged in those articles had yet to become reality. Thus the UN had little practical ability to raise a military force in response to the North Korean invasion of the South. Consequently, the UNSC designated the United States as the executive agent for leading a "unified command" under the UN flag. As it was a designated body, the UN exercised little control over the combat forces. This represented the first attempt at collective security under the UN system.

When the warring parties signed the Korean Armistice Agreement on 27 July 1953, the commander delivered the Agreement to the UN. In August 1953, the United Nations General Assembly passed a resolution “noting with approval” the Armistice Agreement, a step that was critical for the UN to take the next step of organizing the 1954 Geneva Conference meant to negotiate a diplomatic peace between North and South Korea. The adoption of the Korean Armistice Agreement in the UN General Assembly underwrites UN Command's current role of maintaining and enforcing the Armistice Agreement.

The role of the United States as the executive agent for the unified command has led to questions over its continued validity. Most notably, in 1994, UN Secretary General Boutros Boutros-Ghali wrote in a letter to the North Korean Foreign Minister that:

The UN's official position is that the Korean War-era Security Council and General Assembly resolutions remain in force. This was evidenced in 2013 when North Korea announced unilateral abrogation of the Armistice Agreement: UN spokesman Martin Nesirky asserted that since the Armistice Agreement had been adopted by the General Assembly, no single party could dissolve it unilaterally. The UNC continues to serve as the signatory and party of the Armistice opposite the Korean People's Army.

Establishment in 1950 
After troops of North Korea invaded South Korea on 25 June 1950, the United Nations Security Council adopted Resolution 82 calling on North Korea to cease hostilities and withdraw to the 38th parallel.

Two days later, the UNSC adopted Resolution 83, recommending that members of the United Nations provide assistance to the Republic of Korea "to repel the armed attack and to restore international peace and security to the area".

The first non-Korean and non-U.S. unit to see combat was the No. 77 Squadron of the Royal Australian Air Force, which began escort, patrol and ground attack sorties from Iwakuni, Japan on 2 July 1950. For the duration of the war, at least two NZ vessels would be on station in the theater.

Resolution 84, adopted on 7 July 1950, recommended that members providing military forces and other assistance to South Korea "make such forces and other assistance available to a unified command under the United States of America".

President Syngman Rhee of the Republic of Korea assigned operational command of ROK ground, sea, and air forces to General MacArthur as Commander-in-Chief UN Command (CINCUNC) on 15 July 1950:

On 29 August 1950, the British Commonwealth's 27th Infantry Brigade arrived at Busan to join UNC ground forces, which until then included only ROK and U.S. forces. The 27th Brigade moved into the Naktong River line west of Daegu.

Units from other countries of the UN followed: the Belgian United Nations Command, the 25th Canadian Infantry Brigade, the Colombian Battalion, the Ethiopian Kagnew Battalion, the French Battalion, the Greek 15th Infantry Regiment, New Zealand's 16th Field Regiment and Royal New Zealand Artillery, the Philippine Expeditionary Forces to Korea, the South African No. 2 Squadron SAAF, the Turkish Brigade, and forces from Luxembourg and the Netherlands. Additionally, Denmark, India, Iran, Norway and Sweden provided medical units; Italy provided a hospital, even though it was not a UN member.

By 1 September 1950, less than two months before the formation of United Nations Command, these combined forces numbered 180,000, of which 92,000 were South Koreans, with most of the remainder being Americans, followed by the 1,600-man British 27th Infantry Brigade.

Commander

Deputy Commander

Contributing forces: 1950–1953 
During the three years of the Korean War, the following nations were members of the UNC. By 27 July 1953, the day the Armistice Agreement was signed, UNC had reached a peak strength of 932,964:
 Combat forces
 South Korea – 590,911
 United States – 302,483
 Canada – 26,791
 Australia – 17,000
 United Kingdom – 14,198
 Thailand – 6,326
Ethiopia – 6,007
 Turkey – 5,453
 Philippines – 1,468
 New Zealand – 1,385
 Greece – 1,263
 France – 1,119
 Colombia – 1,068
 Belgium – 900
 South Africa – 826
 Netherlands – 819
 Luxembourg – 44
 Humanitarian aid (not counted in total above)
 Denmark (hospital ship MS Jutlandia) – 600
 India
 Italy (68th Field Hospital) – 71
 Norway (NORMASH)
 Sweden

During the course of the war, UNC was led by Douglas MacArthur, Matthew B. Ridgway, and Mark Wayne Clark. After the armistice was signed, John E. Hull was named UNC commander to carry out the ceasefire (including the voluntary repatriation of prisoners of war).

Post Korean War (1953–present) 
Following the signing of the Armistice Agreement, UNC remained in Korea to fulfill the functions of providing security and stability on the Peninsula, as well as supporting UN efforts to rebuild the war-torn Republic of Korea. Much of the fifties was marked by continuous negotiations in Military Armistice Commission meetings while the international community worked to bolster South Korea's economy and infrastructure. During this period, North Korea maintained economic and military superiority over its southern neighbor owing to Chinese and Soviet support.

The sixties proved a tenuous decade on the Korean Peninsula, punctuated by a period of hostilities often referred to as the "Second Korean War." The period between 1966 and 1969 saw a heightened level of skirmishes in the DMZ as well as major incidents including North Korea's attempted assassination of South Korean leader Park Chung-hee and seizure of the USS Pueblo

The seventies saw a brief period of rapprochement that later contributed to structural changes to UNC. In 1972, the North and South Korean governments signed a Joint Communique calling for more peaceful ties between the two Koreas. Concurrently, consecutive U.S. administrations (Nixon, Ford, and Carter) sought to decrease the South Korean reliance upon U.S. forces for maintaining deterrent capabilities on the Korean Peninsula. On 7 November 1978, a combined headquarters, the Republic of Korea – United States Combined Forces Command (CFC), was created, and the South Korean military units with front-line missions were transferred from the UN Command to the CFC's operational control. The commander-in-chief of the CFC, a United States military officer, answered ultimately to the national command authorities of the United States and that of South Korea.

From 1978, UNC maintained its primary functions of maintaining and enforcing the Korean Armistice Agreement, facilitating diplomacy that could support a lasting peace on the Peninsula, and providing a command that could facilitate multinational contributions should the armistice fail. UNC decreased in size, and over time, many of the billets assigned to UNC became multi-hatted with U.S. Forces Korea and Combined Forces Command.

The 1990s again saw notable change in UNC. In October 1991, UNC transferred responsibility of all DMZ sectors except for the Joint Security Area to the ROK military. In 1992, UNC appointed a South Korean General officer to serve as the Senior Member to the Military Armistice Commission. This led to the Korean People's Army and Chinese People's Volunteers boycotting MAC meetings. The collapse of the Soviet Union also led North Korea to question the alignment of their choices for the Neutral Nations Supervisory Commission. They no longer recognized Czech or Slovak representatives of Czechoslovakia when the nation split into the Czech Republic and Slovakia. In 1994, North Korea expelled the Polish delegation and also dismissed the Chinese People's Volunteers from the Panmunjom mission. Owing in part being protest over China's warming ties with South Korea.

Since 1998, UNC has seen a gradual increase of permanent international staff within the command. In between 1998 and 2003, several of the original contributors to the Korean War began deploying personnel to Korea to support UNC's armistice maintenance functions. This internationalization has continued over the next decades. In May 2018, Canadian Lt. General Wayne Eyre became the first non-American to serve as deputy commander of the UNC. Succeeding him was Australian Vice Admiral Stuart Mayer, and the Lieutenant General Andrew Harrison of the British Army, continuing the trend of non-American leadership in UNC.

UNC–Rear
United Nations Command–Rear is located at Yokota Air Base, Japan and is commanded by a Royal Australian Air Force group captain with a deputy commander from the Canadian Forces. Its task is to maintain the SOFA that permits the UNC to retain a logistics rear and staging link on Japanese soil.

Future of the Joint Security Area

To further the September 2018 inter-Korean Comprehensive Military Agreement, UN Command, Republic of Korea Armed Forces, and North Korean People's Army officials met in a series of negotiations to deliberate the demilitarization of the Joint Security Area. The first two meetings in October led to Demining activities within the JSA, de-arming of personnel, and sealing off of Guard Posts. On 6 November 2018, UNC conducted a third round of negotiations with the South Korean military and North Korean People's Army on "Rules of Interaction" which would underwrite a Joint Security Area where both sides of the Military Demarcation Line—the de facto border—would be open to personnel. For undisclosed reasons, the North Korean side refused to meet to finalize these rules and the next step for realizing a demilitarized Joint Security Area.

See also 

 United Nations Memorial Cemetery in Busan, where 2,300 casualties from various nations are buried

Notes

References

Further reading 
 Grey, Jeffrey. The Commonwealth Armies and the Korean War: An Alliance Study. Manchester University Press, 1990.

History of Korea
Korean War
United Nations operations in Asia
United Nations contingents in Korea
United Nations Security Council subsidiary organs
Multinational units and formations
Non-combat military operations involving India
United States and the United Nations